Miodary may refer to the following places in Poland:
Miodary, Lower Silesian Voivodeship (south-west Poland)
Miodary, Opole Voivodeship (south-west Poland)